Ryan Johnston (born 1992) is a Canadian ice hockey defenceman.

Ryan Johnston may also refer to:

Ryan Johnston, Gaelic footballer for Kilcoo GAC
Ryan Johnston, keyboardist in Hawaiian rock band, Goodbye Elliott
Ryan Johnston, bass guitarist in Oregon folk-rock group, The Dimes
Ryan Johnston, American actor and voice actor (see List of Grand Theft Auto characters)
Ryan Johnston, co-designer of the Mondo spider

See also
Ryan Johnson (disambiguation)